Christopher "Christoph" Sanders (born April 21, 1988) is an American actor who is best known for his role as Ned Banks in the television series Ghost Whisperer and Kyle Anderson in the sitcom Last Man Standing on ABC (2011-2017) and FOX (2018-2021).

Early life
Sanders was born in Arden, North Carolina and grew up in nearby Hendersonville, North Carolina. He was home-schooled and participated in such extra curricular activities as soccer and the Boy Scouts of America. He went on to attain scouting's highest rank of Eagle Scout. Concerning the difference Scouting made in his life, Sanders says, "when you spend that much time working on something, it becomes a part of you. Being an Eagle Scout affects your outlook on your fellow man." While growing up, he considered engineering as a possible career. He took drafting classes at Blue Ridge Community College for two years and had been accepted at UNC Wilmington, but decided that acting was what he wanted to do instead.

Career
 
Sanders first became interested in acting at the age of 9 when he began taking classes at the Flat Rock Playhouse, the state theater of North Carolina. He began with basic drama classes before moving on to an intermediate level and finally being invited to join their YouTheater company and gaining membership in its elite conservatory. He graduated from the conservatory program at the age of 18. While there he appeared in more than 16 productions including A Christmas Carol; The Lion, the Witch, and the Wardrobe; and Bye, Bye Birdie. He got his first agent when he was 12 and at the age of 16 did a series of television commercials in Georgia for General Mills.

He made his film debut in 2006 with a small role in Talladega Nights: The Ballad of Ricky Bobby which was filmed primarily in and around Charlotte, North Carolina. That was soon followed by a role in the somewhat controversial movie Hounddog which was shot on a plantation near Wilmington, North Carolina. Much of the film's controversy stemmed from a pivotal scene in which a young girl, played by then 12-year-old actress Dakota Fanning, was raped by Sanders' character. It was a role he found to be challenging, but one that gave him a chance to prove the range of his acting ability. When asked about the controversial scene, Sanders responded, "That's just one part of the film. Tragedies like that happen every day in real life, and I think that if this film opens a few more eyes, then it is definitely worth it. Movies can have that power."

In January 2007, he moved to Los Angeles where there would be more opportunities to pursue acting full-time. He got a part in a TV pilot within three months of being in Hollywood, but the show wasn't picked up by the network. He spent the next several months auditioning before landing a part in the movie Legally Blondes and the role of Ned Banks on Ghost Whisperer. He took over the role of Ned, which was previously held by Tyler Patrick Jones, when producers decided to age the character by few years in order to explore more mature storylines. This was only a recurring guest role in season three, but due to the character's popularity, Sanders became a part of the regular cast at the beginning of season four.

He was cast as Kyle Anderson in the Last Man Standing tv show starring Tim Allen. His character was initially the boyfriend of the eldest daughter of Tim Allen's character, but after Season 1 the producers aged the eldest daughter to play a more motherly role. Sanders' character eventually became the boyfriend, and later husband, to the middle daughter.

Personal life
An avid outdoorsman, Sanders enjoys such activities as hiking, camping, and surfing. He also describes himself as "a pretty great cook."

Filmography

Film

Television

References

External links

1988 births
Male actors from North Carolina
American male child actors
American male film actors
American male television actors
Living people
People from Hendersonville, North Carolina
21st-century American male actors
People from Arden, North Carolina